Grand Dakar is a commune d'arrondissement of the city of Dakar, Senegal.

References

Arrondissements of Dakar